Seidenberg may refer to:

People
 Abraham Seidenberg, an American mathematician
 Avri Elad (Avraham Seidenberg), Israeli secret agent involved in the Lavon Affair
 Dennis Seidenberg, German athlete
 Ivan Seidenberg, Verizon CEO
 Mark Seidenberg, American psycholinguist

Other
 Seidenberg School of Computer Science and Information Systems at Pace University
 Zawidów (formerly ), in Lower Silesian Voivodeship, south-western Poland